Derotmema is a genus of band-winged grasshoppers in the family Acrididae. There are about five described species in Derotmema.

Species
These five species belong to the genus Derotmema:
 Derotmema delicatulum Scudder, 1901 (delicate grasshopper)
 Derotmema haydenii (Thomas, 1872) (Hayden's grasshopper)
 Derotmema laticinctum Scudder, 1901
 Derotmema piute Rehn, 1919
 Derotmema saussureanum Scudder, 1901 (Saussure's desert grasshopper)

References

Further reading

 
 

Oedipodinae
Articles created by Qbugbot